Dunkirk Schooner Site is a historic shipwreck archaeological site located in Lake Erie off Dunkirk in Chautauqua County, New York.

It was listed on the National Register of Historic Places in 2009.

Identity of the Ship
While the ship has never been positively identified, there are two theories of its history. It may have been the Caledonia, built on the River Rouge near Detroit in 1799 and originally used in the fur trade in the early 19th century. It was commandeered by the British military at the outbreak of the War of 1812 and then captured by the Americans a year later. It was later sold to Pennsylvania merchants who renamed it the General Wayne and used it as part of the Underground Railroad to ferry runaway slaves to Canada until sinking sometime before 1850. An alternative theory is that it may be a nameless 1830s schooner that sank carrying grain.

References

Dunkirk
Shipwrecks of Lake Erie
Underground Railroad locations
Shipwrecks on the National Register of Historic Places in New York (state)
National Register of Historic Places in Chautauqua County, New York